Riha is part of a three piece Assamese traditional garment worn with the Mekhela chador. It forms a part of the bridal trousseau for most Assamese brides these days. Riha, mekhela sador and traditional silk wearing are of Boro origin.

See also
Mekhela chador
Textiles and dresses of Assam

References

Textiles and clothing of Assam